San Antonio Reservoir is located in Alameda County, California, about three miles east-southeast of Sunol. It was built in 1964 by the City and County of San Francisco. Formed by the James H. Turner Dam across San Antonio Creek not far above where it flows into Alameda Creek, its purpose is to store water from the Hetch Hetchy Aqueduct and local wells and watersheds.

The reservoir is not open to the public.

See also
List of dams and reservoirs in California
List of lakes in California

References

Reservoirs in Alameda County, California
Hetch Hetchy Project
Reservoirs in California
Reservoirs in Northern California